Loturi may refer to several villages in Romania:

 Loturi, a village in Schitu Golești Commune, Argeș County
 Loturi, a village in Manoleasa Commune, Botoșani County